Vivaldo Barros Frota (December 7, 1928 – January 16, 2015) was a Brazilian politician, lawyer, and academic. Frota was first elected Vice Governor of Amazonas in 1987. He became Governor of the state of Amazonas on April 2, 1990, after his predecessor, outgoing Governor Amazonino Mendes, resigned to run for the Federal Senate. Frota served as Governor until March 15, 1991.

Frota died of stomach cancer at the Hospital Beneficente Português in Manaus on January 16, 2015, at the age of 86.

References

1928 births
2015 deaths
Governors of Amazonas (Brazilian state)
Members of the Chamber of Deputies (Brazil) from Amazonas
20th-century Brazilian lawyers
Deaths from cancer in Amazonas (Brazilian state)
Deaths from stomach cancer